Michel Poldervaart (born 28 March 1988) is a Dutch former professional footballer who played as a midfielder.

Career
Poldervaart moved from Feyenoord to SC Heerenveen in September 2008. He spent the 2009–10 season on loan with FC Emmen, and signed a permanent two-year contract with the club in June 2010. He left Emmen at the end of the 2011–12 season, after his time with the club had been marred by injury. He made a total of 56 league appearances for Emmen, as well as two Cup appearances.

Later life
In 2014, he opened a clothing store in Rotterdam with Royston Drenthe.

References

1988 births
Living people
Dutch footballers
Feyenoord players
SC Heerenveen players
FC Emmen players
Eerste Divisie players
Association football midfielders
Footballers from Rotterdam